Zürich Wiedikon railway station is a railway station on the Zürich S-Bahn system in Wiedikon in the western part of the Swiss city of Zürich. It is the only railway station in Switzerland where the reception building is located like a bridge across the tracks – in German called Reiterbahnhof.

The station is served by S-Bahn trains on the Lake Zürich left bank line approaching the city from the south and south-east directions. InterCity and InterRegio trains and the accelerated S25 service bypass the station through the Zimmerberg Base Tunnel since 2003.

History 
The first Wiedikon station opened in 1875 with the opening of the Lake Zürich left bank line. The line's original routing through the area differed from the current alignment and was largely at street level, with many level crossings, and passed immediately to the east of the existing station.

The current station was built between 1925 and 1927, when the line was rerouted to the west, using a lower level alignment with more tunneling. The architect was Hermann Herter.

Operation 
The railways approach the station from both north and south are below ground level, with a cutting to the north and the  Ulmberg tunnel is to the south. The connecting line to the Giesshübel station on the Sihltal Zürich Uetliberg Bahn diverges at the southern end of the station, also in tunnel. The latter is not normally used for passenger services unless trains are diverted.

The station has three tracks and three platforms. All the platforms can be used by trains in both directions on the Lake Zurich line, but only the westernmost is accessible to trains on the Giesshübel connector.

Services

Train 
The station is served by lines S2, S8, and S24 of Zürich S-Bahn:

During weekends, there is a nighttime S-Bahn service (SN8) offered by ZVV:

Tram/Bus 
There are two tram/bus stops near Wiedikon railway station. Bahnhof Wiedikon is a tram and bus stop in front of the reception building at the southern end of the railway station. The northern access to the platforms is close to tram and bus stop Kalkbreite/Bhf. Wiedikon. Zürich tram routes 9 and 14 stop at Bahnhof Wiedikon, which is also the terminus of municipal bus routes 67 and 76, and of regional bus routes 215, 235, 236, 245 and 350. Tram routes 2 and 3, and trolleybus route 32 stop at Kalkbreite/Bhf. Wiedikon.

Summary of tram and bus services:
Kalkbreite/Bhf.

Gallery

References

External links 
 
 

Swiss Federal Railways stations
Wiedikon
Railway stations in Switzerland opened in 1875